José Buenaventura Durruti Dumange (14 July 1896 – 20 November 1936) was a Spanish insurrectionary, anarcho-syndicalist militant involved with the CNT and FAI in the periods before and during the Spanish Civil War. Durruti played an influential role during the Spanish Revolution and is remembered as a hero in the anarchist movement.

Biography

Early life
José Buenaventura was born in León, Spain, son of Anastasia Dumange and Santiago Durruti, as the second of eight children. He started primary school when he was five and moved to the Calle Misericordia school four years later.

In 1910, aged 14, Durruti left school to become a trainee mechanic in the railway yard in León. He started his first job at Matallana de Torio when he was 18. Like his father, he joined the socialist Unión General de Trabajadores (UGT). He took an active part in the strike of August 1917 called by the UGT when the government overturned an agreement between the union and the employers. The government brought in the Spanish Army to suppress the strike; they killed 70 people and injured more than 500 workers. 2,000 of the strikers were imprisoned without trial or legal process. Durruti managed to escape, but had to flee abroad to France where he came into contact with exiled anarchists. The brutality of the Spanish State against anarchism had a profound and lasting effect on the young Durruti. From the autumn of 1917 until the beginning of 1920, Durruti worked in Paris as a mechanic. He then decided to return to Spain and arrived at San Sebastian, Basque Country, just across the border. Here, he was introduced to local anarchists such as Suberviola, Ruiz, Aldabatrecu or Marcelino del Campo, with whom he formed the anarchist paramilitary group Los Justicieros ("The Avengers"). In 1921, during the inauguration of the Great Kursaal in San Sebastian, members of this group attempted unsuccessfully to assassinate King Alfonso XIII. Shortly after Buenasca, the then president of the recently formed anarchist controlled Confederacion Nacional del Trabajo (CNT), persuaded Durruti to go to Barcelona to organise the workers there where the anarchist movement, as well as the syndicalists, was being brutally suppressed and most of its members jailed or executed. Here, with Juan García Oliver, Francisco Ascaso, Miguel Garcia Vivancos, Alfonso Miguel, Ricardo Sanz, and Aurelio Hernandez, he founded Los Solidarios ("The Solidarity"), one of the most famous of the so-called grupos de afinidad. In 1923 the group was also implicated in the assassination of Cardinal Juan Soldevilla y Romero, as a reprisal for the killing of an anarcho-syndicalist union activist Salvador Seguí. After Miguel Primo de Rivera seized power in Spain in 1923, Durruti and his comrades organised attacks on the military barracks in Barcelona and on the border stations near France. These attacks were unsuccessful and quite a few anarchists were killed. Following these defeats, Durruti, Ascaso and Oliver fled to Latin America. They subsequently travelled widely, visiting Cuba and carrying out bank robberies in Chile and Argentina.

Durruti and his companions returned to Spain and Barcelona, becoming an influential militant group within two of the largest anarchist organizations in Spain at the time, the Federación Anarquista Ibérica (FAI), and of the anarcho-syndicalist trade union Confederación Nacional del Trabajo (CNT). The influence Durruti's group gained inside the CNT caused a split, with a reformist faction under Ángel Pestaña leaving in 1931 and subsequently forming the Syndicalist Party.

In the Civil War

Working closely with his comrades in the FAI and CNT Durruti helped to co-ordinate armed resistance to the military rising of the Nationalist faction, an effort which was to prove vital in preventing General Goded's attempt to seize control of Barcelona. During the battle for the Atarazanas Barracks, Durruti's long-time comrade and closest friend Ascaso was shot dead. Less than a week later, on 24 July 1936 Durruti led over 3,000 armed anarchists (later to become known as the Durruti Column) from Barcelona to Zaragoza. After a brief and bloody battle at Caspe (in Aragón), they also halted at Bujaraloz and at 'Venta de santa Lucia',  Pina de Ebro, on the advice of a regular army officer, postponing an assault on Zaragoza. The presence of Simone Weil in this region, following the Anarchist columns in this time is known. One of Durruti's most famous quotes was "We renounce everything except victory" with the undertone that the socialist revolution had to be stopped in advance of the war efforts.

Death 
In November, having been persuaded to leave Aragón by the anarchist leader Federica Montseny on behalf of the government, Durruti led his militia to Madrid to aid in the defence of the city. On 19 November, he was shot while leading a counterattack in the Casa de Campo area (see also Battle of Madrid).

Antony Beevor in The Spanish Civil War (1982) maintains that Durruti was killed when a companion's machine pistol went off by mistake. He assessed that, at the time, the anarchists lied and claimed he had been hit by an enemy sniper's bullet "for reasons of morale and propaganda". 
The first rumor of his death was that he was shot by his comrades because he enforced discipline.

Durruti died on 20 November 1936, at the age of 40, in a makeshift operating theatre set up in what was formerly the Ritz Hotel. The bullet was lodged in the heart; the diagnosis recorded was "death caused by pleural haemorrhage". In his later book Durruti in the Spanish Revolution, it was alleged that Durruti was killed by a 9mm bullet to the thorax. The autopsy reported:"Durruti had a very developed chest. Given the topography of the thorax, I realized that the diagnosis that surgery was impossible had been mistaken. An operation could have produced positive results, although doubtlessly the patient would not have survived." Following a large funeral procession, he was buried in Barcelona's Montjuïc Cemetery.

A few hours after Durruti's death, in reprisal, José Luzón Morales ordered the execution of 52 policemen who had been held captive in a monastery in Calle de Santa Engracia.

Personal life 
On 14 July 1927, Durruti met French anarcho-syndicalist, writer and shorthand typist Émilienne Morin at the Librairie internationale anarchiste (International Anarchist Library) in Paris. They became life partners until his death. When Durutti was expelled from France in July 1927, Morin accompanied him into Belgium, and worked to feed them both when he was unemployed. The couple travelled to Spain in 1931 and on 4 December 1931, their daughter Colette Durruti was born in Barcelona. Morin brought Collette up virtually single-handedly, with the help of an anarchist friend, Teresa Margaleff due to Durutti's absences. In 1936 Morin ran the press office for the Durutti Column and wrote many articles for French anarchist publications on the situation in Spain. She returned to France after Durutti's death, remaining heavily involved in anarchist politics and writing, and worked to raise funds for Spanish refugees in France.

Legacy 
At first, Durruti's death was not made public, for morale reasons. Durruti's body was transported across the country to Barcelona for his funeral. Over a half million people filled the streets to accompany the cortege during its route to the Montjuïc Cemetery. It was the last large-scale public demonstration of anarchist strength of numbers during the Spanish Civil War.

Hugh Thomas remark, "the death of Durruti marked the end of the classic age of Spanish anarchism. An anarchist poet proclaimed that Durruti’s nobility while living would cause ‘a legion of Durrutis’ to spring up behind him".

In 1937, as a response to the further participation of the CNT-FAI in the Republican government, and after the May Days in 1937 in Barcelona, the Friends of Durruti Group was founded, to try and save the anarchist principles of the revolution. The name of Durruti clearly taken because of the revolutionary commitment and the symbol that he still was for that in the anarchist camp. The Friends of Durruti group had a newspaper called El Amigo del Pueblo (The Friend of the People) and tried to make revolutionary propaganda among the rank and file of the CNT. The group was however fiercely repressed by the reformist wing of the CNT, in collaboration with the Republican government.

A Situationist group of Strasbourg University students spent their student union's budget on a giant flyposted comic strip in 1966. One of its panels, featuring two cowboys discussing philosophical reification, was called The Return of the Durutti Column , in reference to Durruti's military unit. This, in turn, influenced Tony Wilson's naming of his English post-punk band, The Durutti Column.

Willem van Spronsen, an American anarchist who was killed in 2019 while trying to disable a fleet of buses operated by U.S. Immigration and Customs Enforcement (ICE) for mass deportation, used Durruti's surname as a part of his alias.

Gallery

See also 
 Anarchism in Spain
 Anarchist Catalonia

Notes

References

Further reading 

 
 
 
 
 
 

1896 births
1936 deaths
Anarchist assassins
Anarcho-communists
Anarchist partisans
Anarcho-syndicalists
Burials at Montjuïc Cemetery
Confederación Nacional del Trabajo members
Deaths by firearm in Spain
Military personnel killed by friendly fire
Military personnel killed in the Spanish Civil War
People from León, Spain
Spanish anarchists
Spanish anti-fascists
Spanish atheists
Spanish casualties of the Spanish Civil War
Spanish military personnel killed in action
Spanish military personnel of the Spanish Civil War (Republican faction)
Spanish rebels
Spanish revolutionaries